Barry Stevan Shetrone (July 6, 1938 – July 18, 2001) was an American professional baseball player. An outfielder, he appeared in parts of five seasons (1959–1963) in Major League Baseball for the Baltimore Orioles and Washington Senators.

Born in Baltimore, Shetrone graduated from Southern High School, where he was a 1956 high school basketball All-American as chosen by Scholastic Coach magazine. He then signed with his hometown Orioles as an amateur free agent prior to the 1956 baseball season. He spent 3 years in the Baltimore farm system; in 1957 he led the Class C Arizona–Mexico League in hits and runs scored, batting .371. Recalled by the Orioles in midyear of 1959, he collected his first Major League hit, a single off Baseball Hall of Fame pitcher Jim Bunning, in his first MLB game and second at bat on July 27.

He played 58 of his 60 MLB games as an Oriole during trials from 1959 through 1962, and all 23 of his big-league hits came in a Baltimore uniform. They included two doubles, one triple and one home run, a solo blast hit September 1, 1962, off Dave Tyriver of the Cleveland Indians.

Shetrone was traded to the Senators on December 5, 1962. He went hitless in two at bats for Washington in May and June of 1963, then returned to the minors for the rest of his pro career. He retired in 1967 after 12 pro seasons.

Barry Shetrone died in Bowie, Maryland, at the age of 63.

References

External links

Retrosheet
Venezuelan Professional Baseball League

1938 births
2001 deaths
American expatriate baseball players in Canada
American expatriate baseball players in Panama
American expatriate baseball players in Venezuela
Baltimore Orioles players
Baseball players from Baltimore
Columbus Jets players
Hawaii Islanders players
Houston Astros scouts
Major League Baseball outfielders
Miami Marlins (IL) players
Paris Orioles players
Phoenix Stars players
Richmond Virginians (minor league) players
Rochester Red Wings players
San Diego Padres (minor league) players
Seattle Rainiers players
Tigres de Aragua players
Toronto Maple Leafs (International League) players
Vancouver Mounties players
Washington Senators (1961–1971) players
York White Roses players